Tremedda is a hamlet in the parish of Zennor, Cornwall, England, United Kingdom.

References

Further reading
Symons, Alison (1992) Tremedda Days: a view of Zennor, 1900-44. Tabb House

Hamlets in Cornwall